Defender of the Crown is a strategy computer game designed by Kellyn Beck. It was Cinemaware's first game, and was originally released for the Commodore Amiga in 1986, setting a new standard for graphic quality in home computer games.

In 1987 it was ported to MS-DOS, the Atari ST and the Macintosh and a conversion was done for the Commodore 64. Later it was ported to the CDTV, CD-i and Atari Jaguar and conversions were made for the Nintendo Entertainment System (NES), Amstrad CPC, Apple IIGS and Intellivision. Unofficially a ZX Spectrum version was also made. A sequel, Defender of the Crown II, was released in 1993 for the CDTV and Amiga CD32. Two remakes have been released: Robin Hood: Defender of the Crown in 2003 and Defender of the Crown: Heroes Live Forever in 2007.

Gameplay
The game is set in England in 1149 during the Middle Ages where, following the death of the king, different factions are fighting for territorial control.

The player assumes the role of a Saxon (Wilfred of Ivanhoe, Cedric of Rotherwood, Geoffrey Longsword, or Wolfric the Wild) and tries to fight off the Norman hordes and wrestle for control of England. Eventually, the player must fight for control of all territories, and potentially those controlled by other Saxons, if they have become antagonistic. The player must amass armies and fight for control of opponents' castles. The player may engage enemy armies in battle and loot or lay siege to opposing castles. Territories can also be won in the periodic jousting contests. From time to time the player may attempt to rescue a damsel in distress and can appeal for help from the legendary bandit Robin Hood.

The game's strategy boils down to a war of attrition as the player tries to amass larger armies than his opponents and manages to attack their territories at the right time.

Due to financial strains, Cinemaware decided to release the initial version without all the features originally planned for because of their need for revenue. Some features were partially implemented, but were removed so the game could be shipped. Some additional features completed but never seen in the shipped game include flaming fireballs (launched via the catapult), more locations (more varied castles to attack), and more in-depth strategy. Some of these features were implemented in later versions of the game.

James D. Sachs, the primary artist for the game, showcased some of these features on the Amiga during interviews after the release of the game.

Cover art
The cover art of Defender of the Crown was put together by Peter Green Design and painted by Ezra Tucker.

Randy McDonald was in charge of art direction, design, and production for Cinemaware's first four games, and he explains in an interview that "Peter Greene or I would do a sketch of generally what we wanted for each cover. I went to Western Costume in Hollywood, which for many decades was the giant in the costume industry there, and rented costumes for the types of "look" we had settled on for each cover. We hired models and brought them into Peter's large photo studio, where we set them up in the costumes I had rented, posed as closely as possible to the way we wanted them to be illustrated."

The initial artist, according to Randy McDonald, was supposed to be Greg Winter, but the cover eventually went to Ezra Tucker.

Versions
The versions of Defender of the Crown, notably for DOS and the NES, resulted in an enormous loss in graphic and audio quality due to those systems' inferior abilities compared to the Amiga. But these versions featured more in-depth strategic elements compared to the unfinished  original version. The Apple IIGS, Atari ST, and Commodore 64 versions were done with better success, the IIGS, Macintosh, and ST versions' graphics coming quite close to the Amiga version. A version for the Sharp X68000 was in development by Bullet-Proof Software but never released.

All versions:
 Amstrad CPC
 Atari ST
 Apple IIGS
 Commodore 64
Apple Macintosh
 Game Boy Advance
 Nintendo Entertainment System
 Macintosh
 DOS CGA (4 color) and EGA (16 color)
 ZX Spectrum (unofficial)
 CD-i
 iOS
 Android
 Atari Jaguar
 Intellivision

In 1989, the game became the second game to ship on CD-ROM, after The Manhole.

Reception
The first public demonstration of Defender of the Crown occurred at the Los Angeles Commodore Show in September 1986, before its November release, and attracted a huge crowd. The game amazed those who saw it for the first time:

Defender of the Crown became a commercial hit. In 1989, Video Games & Computer Entertainment reported that it had been purchased by "almost three-quarters of a million gamers worldwide". Sales had surpassed 1 million units by 2001.

Info gave the Amiga version four stars out of five, stating that its "graphics have set new standards for computer games". The magazine praised the "breathtaking" animation and "impressive" color, but hoped that future Cinemaware games would improve on the "adequate" gameplay, which was "the weak link". The Australian Commodore Review gave the Commodore 64 version of the game a total score of 96 out of 100, while Commodore User said that it was "totally brilliant and one of the best games to date on the 64." Computer Gaming World praised the Amiga version of Defender of the Crown'''s graphics and animation, calling the game "a showcase program to demonstrate the power of the Amiga to your friends." Although the gameplay was not as complex as other strategy games of the time, the reviewer was still exceptionally pleased with Cinemaware's first game. That year the magazine gave Defender of the Crown a special award for "Artistic Achievement in a Computer Game", but in 1990 and 1993, surveys of wargames in the magazine gave the game two-plus stars out of five.Compute! also stated that Defender of the Crown effectively demonstrated the Amiga's graphics, but stated that its gameplay was oversimplified. CU Amiga stated that "there are not many areas in which Defender of the Crown could be improved ... the graphics are sophisticated with lush colours and visual effects." Amiga Format were less kind to the CD rerelease of the game, stating that it "hasn't stood the test of time simply because the gameplay is somewhat weak."The One magazine in 1991 rated the game four out of five stars for the Amiga, Atari ST and PC. In 1996, Computer Gaming World declared Defender of the Crown the 92nd-best computer game ever released.

LegacyDefender of the Crown II was published by Commodore International in 1993 for the CDTV and Amiga CD32.

After a string of successful games and game series, Cinemaware eventually went bankrupt. In 2000, however, Lars Fuhrken-Batista and Sean Vesce bought Cinemaware's name and assets, and founded Cinemaware Inc., naming a remake of Defender of the Crown for modern PCs as one of the reformed company's first projects. The new version, titled Robin Hood: Defender of the Crown was released in 2003 for the PlayStation 2 (September 30), Xbox (October 6), and Windows (October 15). The new company also created "Digitally Remastered Versions" of classic Cinemaware games, including Defender of the Crown.

In February 2007, a second remake to the game called Defender of the Crown: Heroes Live Forever was released by eGames,<ref>[http://www.egames.com/gamepage.php?id=60 Defender of the Crown: Heroes Live Forever]  from eGames</ref> who had acquired Cinemaware in 2005. Heroes Live Forever features many of the elements of the original game, including jousting and archery tournaments, raiding castles, rescuing princesses, and laying siege to enemy fortresses via catapult. A new addition to the game involved the use of Hero and Tactic cards during battles, giving the user's army various upgrades during the on-screen melee.

During the second half of the 1980s, some games directly inspired by Defender of the Crown were released. Among these was for example Joan of Arc (Rainbow Arts, 1989).

The Danish band PRESS PLAY ON TAPE remixed the theme music of the game on their 2003 album Run/Stop Restore, replacing the instrumental tune with proper medieval-sounding lyrics.

References

External links

Defender of the Crown on the Amiga at The Hall of Light (HOL)
Images of Defender of the Crown box, manual and screen shots at C64Sets.com
Panda's Defender of the Crown page
https://web.archive.org/web/20160619205027/http://www.thelegacy.de/Museum/game.php3?titel_id=4073&game_id=4108
Legally distributed recordings of the Amiga version music
Macintosh Plus game gallery featuring DotC screenshots
Review in Isaac Asimov's Science Fiction Magazine

1986 video games
Amiga games
Amstrad CPC games
Apple IIGS games
Atari Jaguar games
Atari ST games
Cancelled X68000 games
CD-i games
Cinemaware games
Commodore 64 games
Commodore CDTV games
DOS games
Game Boy Advance games
Games commercially released with DOSBox
IOS games
Classic Mac OS games
Mobile games
Nintendo Entertainment System games
Robin Hood video games
Strategy video games
Video games developed in the United States
Video games set in medieval England
Windows games
ZX Spectrum games
Video games set in the 12th century